The University of Chicago Graduate Library School (GLS) was established in 1928 to develop a program for the graduate education of librarians with a focus on research.  Housed for a time in the Joseph Regenstein Library, the GLS closed in 1989. GLS faculty were among the most prominent researchers in librarianship in the twentieth century. Alumni of the school have made a great impact on the profession including Hugh Atkinson, Susan Grey Akers, Bernard Berelson, Michèle Cloonan, El Sayed Mahmoud El Sheniti, Eliza Atkins Gleason, Frances E. Henne, Virginia Lacy Jones, Judith Krug, Miriam Matthews, Kathleen de la Peña McCook, Elizabeth Homer Morton, Benjamin E. Powell, W. Boyd Rayward, Charlemae Hill Rollins, Katherine Schipper, Ralph R. Shaw, Spencer Shaw, Peggy Sullivan, Maurice Tauber and Tsuen-hsuin Tsien.

In February 2016, Carla Hayden (PhD, 1987) was nominated by President Obama to serve as Librarian of Congress. She was confirmed in July 2016.

History

Early in the 20th century, the Carnegie Corporation of New York began offering grants to change the direction of library education and scholarship. Of particular interest was the creation of an institution analogous to the Harvard Law School or the Johns Hopkins School of Medicine.  The result was a sensation: the 1926 endowment of a research-oriented program offering only the Ph.D. degree, With an emphasis on investigation fostered among students, studies conducted and conferences held at GLS provided a center for intellectual inquiry in the development of 20th century librarianship.  The Library Quarterly, a scholarly journal focused on research, was launched in 1931 to provide an outlet for the publication of rigorous research.

On the occasion of the 25th anniversary of the establishment of the Graduate Library School in 1951 Louis Round Wilson assessed its impact noting that it broadened the concept of librarianship, developed it as a field for scientific study, introduced critical objectivity, contributed to the philosophy of librarianship by scholarly publishing and furnished leaders to the field. Writing of the impact of the Graduate Library School in 2020, Nathan Johnson has observed that its faculty were more closely aligned with the social sciences  and they "turned a research gaze on the spaces codified and distributed during the earlier eras of American librarianship."

Structure and focus

The Graduate Library School (GLS) at the University of Chicago changed the structure and focus of education for librarianship in the twentieth century. Funded by the Carnegie Corporation  the GLS set forth policies to establish an institution to educate students imbued with the spirit of investigation. Prior to establishment of the GLS education for librarians had been an apprenticeship model. Douglas Waples wrote of the policies that would differentiate  “The Graduate Library School at Chicago” from schools in the apprenticeship mode.

John V. Richardson Jr. has written of the establishment and the first 30 years of the GLS in The Spirit of Inquiry: The Graduate Library School at Chicago, 1921–51. 

Joyce M. Latham has written of the role of GLS faculty in the development of the Chicago Public Library (CPL) noting "In their final report on the status of CPL, A Metropolitan Library in Action, Carleton B. Joeckel and Leon Carnovsky devoted significant attention to the role
of the public library in adult education."

A list of the Dissertations, Theses, and Papers demonstrates the range of early inquiry.

The faculty of the GLS  had a profound effect on the development of public library structure and governance following World War II.<ref>Joeckel, C.B. ed. (1946). Library Extension, Problems and Solutions. Chicago: University of Chicago Press</ref> Joeckel developed  the National Plan for Public Library Service in 1948.Richards, John S. “The National Plan for Public Library Service.” ALA Bulletin 41, no. 8 (1947): 283–93. GLS faculty were also innovators in the use of computers for library functions. In 1982 Don Swanson described the Microsystem for Interactive Bibliographic Searching (MIRABILIS) for the general library community in Library Journal 

Faculty
Faculty who taught at the GLS included many scholars who conducted foundational research in librarianship including Lester Asheim, Abraham Bookstein, Lee Pierce Butler, Leon Carnovsky, Margaret Egan, Sara I. Fenwick, Herman H. Fussler, J. C. M. Hanson, Frances E. Henne, Carleton B. Joeckel, W. Boyd Rayward, Jesse Shera, Don R. Swanson, Peggy Sullivan, Zena Sutherland, Tsuen-hsuin Tsien, Robert W. Wadsworth, Douglas Waples, Louis Round Wilson, Howard W. Winger, and Victor Yngve. Louis Round Wilson's tenure as professor and dean from 1932-1942 has been viewed as the golden age of education for librarianship 

The Library Quarterly

The faculty of the Graduate Library School established the journal, The Library Quarterly'' in 1931. The work of the GLS faculty to establish a scholarly journal focused on research has been carefully detailed by Steve Norman.

The Bulletin of the Center for Children's Books
The Bulletin of the Center for Children's Books was established in 1945 at the Graduate Library School by Frances E. Henne

References

External links
Guide to the University of Chicago Graduate Library School Records 1928-1979 at the University of Chicago Special Collections Research Center

Library science education
Schools of informatics
Library
Defunct private universities and colleges in Illinois